The Libyan passport is issued to citizens of Libya for international travel.

History
The Libyan passport design has been changed at least 5 or 6 times. The passport was most recently redesigned in 2014, following the killing of Muammar Gaddafi and subsequent regime change.

Kingdom of Libya
During the last days of the Kingdom of Libya, the Libyan passport was valid to the countries shown below:

All Arab countries, Pakistan, Chad, Niger, Nigeria, Ghana, Somaliland, Ethiopia, Cyprus, Malta, India, Japan, the Republic of China (Taiwan), Turkey, Greece, Yugoslavia, Italy, Switzerland, Austria, (West) Germany, France, Spain, the Netherlands, Belgium, Luxembourg, the United Kingdom, Denmark, Sweden, Norway, and the United States.

The color of the passport was black and featured the monarchy's emblem in the middle.

Libyan Arab Republic
After the overthrow of the monarchy and the establishment of a republic by Gaddafi on 1 September 1969, the Libyan passport had over time become valid to People's Republic of Bulgaria, Czechoslovakia, the Soviet Union, and Romania.

The color of the passport was black and featured the Eagle of Saladin in the middle.

Libyan Arab Jamahiriya 
In the early 1990s, the Libyan passport was valid to all countries in the world, except South Africa, and occupied Palestine.

The color of the passport was green, representing Libya's past flag, and features the Hawk of Quraish in the middle.

State of Libya 
After the 2011 civil war, nothing changed except now a Libyan citizen is allowed to go to South Africa.

The color of the passport is blue and features a star and crescent, an emblem on the current flag and symbol of Islam.

See also
Visa requirements for Libyan citizens

References

Libya
Government of Libya